The Red line is a metro line of Kaohsiung Metro which runs north–south through the city of Kaohsiung, Taiwan. At , it is the fourth-longest metro line in Taiwan, after Taoyuan Airport MRT, Tamsui-Xinyi Line and Zhonghe-Xinlu Line.

There is a plan to extend the line north to Hunei District. This would add 8 stations to the line.

History
In the “1988 Kaohsiung Metropolitan Metro System Feasibility Study”, the Red line was amongst the four lines planned. In January 1991, it was one of the two lines categorised to open as Phase 1 in period 1. Further progress was halted in March 1995 due to skepticism for the need of it within the city council, citing traffic congestion within the city to be not critical.

The line was the first metro line built in southern Taiwan, and started construction on 24 October 2001. It opened for service on 9 March 2008 and was free for one month until 6 April.

Stations

Notes
 A^ The full name is National Kaohsiung First University of Science and Technology.
 B^ The full name is National Kaohsiung Marine University.
 C^ The full name is Kaohsiung Rapid Transit Corporation.

References

2008 establishments in Taiwan
Standard gauge railways in Taiwan
Kaohsiung Metro
Railway lines opened in 2008
Airport rail links in Taiwan
750 V DC railway electrification